Margaret Wood was a Scottish Catholic courtier. She was a daughter of Patrick Wood, Laird of Bonnyton and Nicholas Wardlaw, Lady Bonnyton, who was a daughter of Henry Wardlaw of Torrie and a former lady in waiting to Mary, Queen of Scots.

The Catholic author George Conn described her as the sister of James Wood, the younger laird of Boniton or Bonnington (Bonnyton) near Montrose in Maryton parish, and wife of James (or William) Gray, tutor of the House of Schivas. She had been brought up among the maidens of the household of Anne of Denmark. She joined a nunnery at Carpentras. Her sister Magdalen Wood married George Leslie of Kincraigie.

Anne of Denmark bought clothes for some of the ladies in waiting and servants in Scotland, including a warm woollen gown of black cloth and plaiding for "Magie", possibly to be identified as Margaret Wood. The gowns were made in 1593 for the "maidens" or "damsels" who served in the queen's chamber.

In 1598 she organised the baptism of the child of a woman in Ellon parish, Elizabeth Burn from the Yett of Birness. Wood told her to take the baby to "the burn next to Barrowley" near Buffel Hill, where a man dressed in black plaid performed the ceremony.

Her brother, James Wood, returned to Scotland from France in April 1599 travelling with the English poet Henry Constable. The English diplomat George Nicholson noted that he was a Catholic and had a disagreement with his father. James Wood was arrested after breaking into his father's house. A family dispute involved the lands of Birness, part of his mother's "conjunct fie", which he had given to his wife, Barbara Gray (a kinswoman of Margaret Wood's husband). He was carrying letters from Anne of Denmark to the Pope. He was found guilty of theft and rebellion and executed on 27 April 1601.

References

16th-century Scottish women
Household of Anne of Denmark
Scottish ladies-in-waiting
Scottish Roman Catholic religious sisters and nuns
People from Angus, Scotland